Stanisława Anna Okularczyk (born 12 May 1943 in Bujne) is a Polish politician. She was elected to the Sejm on 25 September 2005, getting 12,016 votes in 14 Nowy Sącz district as a candidate from the Law and Justice list.

See also

Members of Polish Sejm 2005-2007

External links
Stanisława Anna Okularczyk - parliamentary page - includes declarations of interest, voting record, and transcripts of speeches.

Members of the Polish Sejm 2005–2007
Women members of the Sejm of the Republic of Poland
Civic Platform politicians
1943 births
Living people
21st-century Polish women politicians